Ancient Ostra is a Roman era town situated between the modern town of Ostra Vetere the Roman town was inhabited from the 3rd century BC until the 6th century AD.

History
Neither town survived beyond the classical period. Though Ostra is little mentioned by ancient authors, excavations there have brought to light remains of various buildings and several inscriptions.

See also

 Archaeological Park of Urbs Salvia
 Potentia (ancient city)
 Ricina
 Sentinum
 Suasa
 Septempeda

External links

References

Roman towns and cities in Italy
Roman sites of the Marche
Ostra
Tourist attractions in le Marche
Archaeological sites in le Marche
Populated places established in the 3rd century BC
Former populated places in Italy